The 1968 United States presidential election in Tennessee took place on November 5, 1968. All 50 states and the District of Columbia were part of the 1968 United States presidential election. Tennessee voters chose 11 electors to the Electoral College, who voted for president and vice president.

Tennessee voted more or less equally for the candidates, resulting in Republican candidate Richard Nixon of New York and his running mate Governor Spiro Agnew of Maryland receiving a plurality of the votes as opposed to a majority. Tennessee had the smallest percentage of the Nixon vote that delivered him the state.

Nixon carried Tennessee with 37.85% of the vote to American Party candidate George Wallace’s 34.02% and Democratic candidate Hubert Humphrey's 28.13%, a victory margin of 3.87%. Nixon's victory was due to his large margins in traditionally Republican East Tennessee, while Wallace and Humphrey split Middle Tennessee and West Tennessee. , this is the last election in which Hamilton County did not support the Republican presidential candidate.

Results

Results by county

Notes

References

Tennessee
1968
1968 Tennessee elections